Red Army is a 2014 American-Russian documentary film directed, produced, and written by Gabe Polsky, executive produced by Jerry Weintraub and Werner Herzog. It premiered at the 2014 Cannes Film Festival and was released in limited theaters by Sony Pictures Classics on January 23, 2015. The film tells the story of the Soviet Union national ice hockey team through the eyes of team captain Slava Fetisov, in particular the famed 1990s five-man unit known as The Russian Five.

The film details the link between sports and politics. The film also narrates how players were wooed by National Hockey League scouts and eventually flooded NHL rosters. The film is particularly harsh on the ruthless tactics of coach Viktor Tikhonov about whom none of the players have a kind word. Tikhonov died in November 2014.

The movie uses rare archival footage, including children singing "No Coward Plays Hockey."

Background
The film relates the Soviet Union's dominance of ice hockey during the Cold War.

Release
Red Army made its North American debut at the 2014 Toronto International Film Festival and was released in American theaters by Sony Pictures Classics. The film is about the Soviet-Russian game from the 1950s to the dominance of the 1970s and 1980s and then gradual deterioration in the 1990s. The film was screened in the Special Screenings section of the 2014 Cannes Film Festival.

The film was included in the official selections at the 2014 Telluride, Toronto and New York film festivals. Red Army won Audience Awards at the 2014 AFI, Chicago and Middleburg film festivals. The film was also selected as the Opening Ceremony film of the 2014 Moscow International Film Festival.

Reception
Red Army is one of the best reviewed films of 2014, maintaining a 97% rating on Rotten Tomatoes with an average rating of 7.9/10 based on 92 reviews. The site's consensus reads: "Fun and fascinating, Red Army delivers absorbing documentary drama for hockey fans and sports novices alike." On Metacritic, the film has an 83 out of 100 rating based on 33 critics, indicating "universal acclaim".

A. O. Scott of The New York Times called the film a "stirring, crazy story—a Russian novel of Tolstoyan sweep and Gogl-esque absurdity". Time magazine said: "this playful, poignant film presents a human story that transcends decades, borders and ideologies". Scott Feinberg of The Hollywood Reporter called the film "one of the best documentaries that I have ever seen".

The film was nominated for Best Documentary Screenplay from the Writers Guild of America.

References

External links
Sony Pictures Classics official site

2014 films
2010s Russian-language films
2010s biographical films
2014 documentary films
2010s historical films
American biographical films
American sports documentary films
American historical films
American independent films
Films scored by Christophe Beck
Russian biographical films
Russian documentary films
Russian historical films
Russian independent films
Documentary films about ice hockey
Documentary films about the Cold War
Documentary films about the Soviet Union
Ice hockey in the Soviet Union
Sony Pictures Classics films
American ice hockey films
Russian ice hockey films
2010s English-language films
Films directed by Gabe Polsky
2010s American films
2014 multilingual films
American multilingual films
Russian multilingual films